This is a list of the municipalities in the state of Maranhão (MA), located in the Northeast Region of Brazil. Maranhão is divided into 217 municipalities, which are grouped into 21 microregions, which are grouped into 5 mesoregions.

See also
Geography of Brazil
List of cities in Brazil

Maranhao